Thomas McAllister (7 September 1881 – 14 March 1951) was a Scottish professional football right half who played in the Football League for Leeds City and Blackburn Rovers.

Career statistics

References

English footballers
Scottish footballers

Brentford F.C. players
English Football League players
Association football wing halves
Castleford Town F.C. players
Blackburn Rovers F.C. players
Southern Football League players
Leeds City F.C. players
Halifax Town A.F.C. players
1881 births

1951 deaths
People from Govan